The Persian embassy to Louis XIV caused a dramatic flurry at the court of Louis XIV in 1715, the year of the Sun King's death. Mohammed Reza Beg, or in French sources , was a high-ranking official to the Persian governor of the  Iravan (Erivan) province. He had been chosen by the Safavid Persian emperor Sultan Husayn for the mission and travelled with a grand entourage, as suitable to the diplomat of a mighty empire.

The embassy
The scene of the Persian ambassador's entry into Paris, 7 February 1715,  was described by François Pidou de Saint-Olon (1646–1720), a nobleman who was delegated the diplomatic position of liaison officer to the Persian delegation:

During several months that he spent at Versailles, Mohammed Reza Beg conducted negotiations towards establishing trade treaties between Persia and France, as well as on specific agreements concerning the installation of consulates. He conferred with the French on possible joint military operations against the Ottoman Empire. But negotiations were impeded by Louis XIV's bad state of health. Nevertheless, Mohammed Reza Beg returned to Persia in autumn 1715 bearing treaties on commerce and friendship between France and Persia that had been signed in Versailles on 13 August. As another result of the diplomatic mission, a permanent Persian consulate was established in Marseille, the main French Mediterranean port for the trade with the East, soon staffed by Hagopdjan de Deritchan.

Influences in literature

During the time he spent in Paris, however, feverish speculation ran rife about this exotic personage, his unpaid bills, his lavish but exotic lifestyle, the possibilities of amours, all concentrated in a pot-boiler romance of the beautiful but repeatedly kidnapped Georgian, Amanzolide, by M. d'Hostelfort, Amanzolide, nouvelle historique et galante, qui contient les aventures secrètes de Mehemed-Riza-Beg, ambassadeur du Sophi de Perse à la cour de Louis le Grand en 1715. (Paris: P. Huet, 1716). It was quickly translated into English, as Amanzolide, story of the life, the amours and the secret adventures of Mehemed-Riza-Beg, Persian ambassador to the court of Louis the Great in 1715 a true turquerie, or fanciful Eastern imagining, which  did not discriminate too finely between Ottoman Turkey and Safavid Persia.

More permanent literary results were embodied in Montesquieu's Lettres Persanes (1725), in which a satiric critique of French society was placed in the pen of an imagined Persian homme de bonne volonté, a "man of good will".

The Memoirs of Saint-Simon for the year record contemporary court gossip that the ambassador was in fact an ordinary merchant from Persian lands, perhaps sent by "the governor of his province with business to transact in France" and put up as an ambassador by Pontchartrain, minister for trade and much else, essentially in a successful attempt to cheer up the aged king. He says of the ambassador "there seemed to be nothing genuine about him, and his behaviour was as disgraceful as his wretched suite and miserable presents. Moreover he produced neither credentials nor instructions from the King of Persia or his ministers".

See also
 Persian embassy to Europe (1599–1602)
 Persian embassy to Europe (1609–1615)
 Franco-Persian alliance
 France-Iran relations
 Franco-Ottoman alliance

Notes

External links
 1715 Reception of the Persian embassy (official website of Château de Versailles
 

Foreign relations of the Ancien Régime
Ancien Régime
Diplomatic missions of Safavid Iran
1715 in international relations
Treaties of the Kingdom of France
Treaties of the Safavid dynasty
France–Iran relations
1715 in France
1715 in Iran
History of the foreign relations of Iran
History of the foreign relations of France